is a Japanese football player. His position is defensive midfielder.

National team career
On December 30, 2006, Ogura was announced as being selected to be on Japan U-23 national team. This selection was reaffirmed on May 27, 2007, and he seems likely to stay with the squad through the 2008 Beijing Olympics.

Club statistics
Updated to 23 February 2017.

Reserves performance

National team statistics

Appearances in major competitions

Honours
Yokohama F. Marinos
Emperor's Cup: 2013

Gamba Osaka
Japanese Super Cup: 2015

References

External links

Profile at Ventforet Kofu 

1985 births
Living people
Association football people from Chiba Prefecture
Japanese footballers
J1 League players
J2 League players
J3 League players
Mito HollyHock players
Yokohama F. Marinos players
Gamba Osaka players
Gamba Osaka U-23 players
Montedio Yamagata players
Ventforet Kofu players
Association football midfielders